Phetsmone Sonnavanh (born 2 February 1966) is a Laotian boxer. He competed in the men's bantamweight event at the 1988 Summer Olympics.

References

External links
 

1966 births
Living people
Laotian male boxers
Olympic boxers of Laos
Boxers at the 1988 Summer Olympics
Place of birth missing (living people)
Bantamweight boxers